Sir John Chalker Crosbie    (11 September 1876 – 5 October 1932) was a Newfoundland merchant and politician.

An aggressive and energetic entrepreneur, he created a fortune (which he lost) and started the Crosbie dynasty. His son, Chesley Crosbie, and grandson, John Crosbie were both affluent politicians. In 1900 Crosbie founded Crosbie and Co. and by 1920 was one of the leading fish exporters in Newfoundland.

He entered politics as MHA for Bay de Verde in 1908. After Edward Morris resigned at the end of 1917, Crosbie served as Prime Minister in a caretaker capacity until 5 January 1918, when William Lloyd took office. He was Minister of Shipping in 1919 and Minister of Finance and Customs under Prime Minister Walter Monroe from 1924 to 1928.

Crosbie was knighted KBE in 1919.

References

External links
 
 Sir John Chalker Crosbie at The Canadian Encyclopedia

1876 births
1932 deaths
Businesspeople from the Dominion of Newfoundland
Newfoundland People's Party MHAs
Knights Commander of the Order of the British Empire
Prime Ministers of the Dominion of Newfoundland